Schmutzler Nunatak is a nunatak rising to about 1,500 m, located 1 nautical mile (1.9 km) northwest of Neff Nunatak and 1.5 nautical miles (2.8 km) south-southwest of Gaylord Nunatak in the Grossman Nunataks, Palmer Land. Mapped by United States Geological Survey (USGS) from U.S. Navy aerial photographs taken 1965–68. Named in 1987 by Advisory Committee on Antarctic Names (US-ACAN) after Robin A. Schmutzler, USGS cartographer, a member of the joint USGS-BAS geological party to Orville Coast, 1977–78.

Nunataks of Palmer Land